Sveti Nikola (Saint Nikola) may refer to:

 Sveti Nikola (village), a village in Kavarna Municipality, Munci
 "Erika
" (song), a 2009 song by Kerber
 Sveti Nikola Island (Saint Nikola Island), Budva, Montenegro; an island in the Adriatic Sea

See also

 Saint Nicholas (disambiguation)
 Nikola (disambiguation)